Mohishtoli is a village in Gopalganj District, Bangladesh, part of Muksudpur Upazila. The village covers an area of 2.5 km2, and is bordered by the villages of Nanikhir, Barovatra, Goalgram, Kasalia.

Mohishtoli under Nanikhir Union parishad was established in 1856. The village consists of three wards and few mahallas. The village has a primary school, four Temples, and few community schools.

Non-governmental organizations operating in Mohishtoli include BDAO (the Bangladesh Development Acceleration Organisation), BRAC, CCDB, ASA, World Vision, and HCCB.

Populated places in Dhaka Division